Koidu-Sefadu Sports Stadium is a multi-use 2,000 capacity soccer stadium located in Koidu Town, Kono District, Sierra Leone. The stadium is used mostly for football matches and is the home ground of the Diamond Stars, the club that represents the Kono District. 

Football venues in Sierra Leone
Koidu